Thagadu is a 2016 Indian Tamil-language action drama film written and directed by M. Thangadurai. The film stars Prabha, Ajay and Sanam Shetty in the lead roles. It was released on 2 September 2016.

Cast 
Prabha
Ajay
Sanam Shetty
Ram Kiran
Vivin
Priyanka Shukla
Aysha
R. Deepak Raj
Raj Kapoor as King's Minister
Mippu as Rowdy
Rajendran Kuppusamy
M. Thangadurai
Sabitha Anand
Nellai Siva as Park officer
Hasika Dutt in a special appearance

Production 
Sanam Shetty was cast to play a princess. The film stars several newcomers who play college students in the film. The historical portions were shot at Kangundi Fort in Andhra Pradesh. Prabha and Ajay play lead roles in the film.

An audio launch was held in July 2016 with Tamil film industry personalities such as R. K. Selvamani, T. Siva and Perarasu in attendance.

Release 
The Times of India Samayam gave the film a rating of two out of five stars. The reviewer praised the historical scenes while criticizing the story. A critic from Maalai Malar also gave the film a negative review, concluding that the tale was "old". A review from the film portal Iflicks.com noted "the story could have been narrated in a short time, the unwanted extension of the sequences seem to drag the movie."

References

External links 
 
 

2010s Tamil-language films
2016 films
Indian action drama films